Virginia Coalition is an American rock band from Alexandria, Virginia, whose five founding members met in the early 1990s at T. C. Williams High School. Often referred to as VACO by fans (and the band), the band self-released their first album, The Colors of The Sound, in 1998. The group toured between Boston and Virginia heavily in the late 1990s, supporting The Colors of the Sound and its 2000 follow-up, Townburg; the band's tour van logged more than 100,000 miles by May 2001. The band's 2003 album on Koch Records, Rock & Roll Party, peaked at #18 on the Billboard Top Internet Albums chart. This album marked their transition from a band that primarily played in the Northeast and Mid-Atlantic regions of the United States to a nationwide touring act. The group's next full-length, OK to Go, was released in 2004 and was produced by Matt Wallace. In 2008 they followed up with the album Home This Year. 

The band's original lineup consisted of:

 Andrew Poliakoff - lead vocals, guitar, percussion
 Steve Dawson - lead vocals, guitar
 Paul Ottinger - keyboards, percussion, vocals, bass guitar, guitar,
 Jarrett Nicolay - bass guitar, banjo, guitar, vocals, Casio
 John Patrick "JP" - drums, percussion, vocals
 
Former songwriter and lead guitarist Steve Dawson left the band in late 2003.  Dawson was a significant contributor to the band's first three albums, singing lead vocals on approximately half the band's released tracks. In February 2007, VACO announced the departure of another founding member, John Patrick. Steve Dawson re-joined the band for concerts in early 2011. 

In recent years the following musicians have joined the band live for occasional concerts:
 Adam Dawson - drums
 Eli Staples - keyboards
 Jay Starling - lap steel guitar

Discography 
 1998 - The Colors of The Sound
 2000 - Townburg
 2003 - Rock and Roll Party
 2003 - Fake Out Takes (Not for Production)
 2004 - OK to Go
 2005 - The Bob Years
 2006 - Live At The 9:30 Club
 2006 - Winter '07 (side-project of bassist Jarrett Nicolay as My New Mixtape)
 2008 - Almost Home (EP)
 2008 - Home This Year
 2021 - VACO 2021EP (EP)

References

External links
 Twitter page
 Facebook page
 Virginia Coalition collection at the Internet Archive's live music archive

Rock music groups from Virginia
Musical groups established in 1997
1997 establishments in Virginia